Margaret Jean White  (born 4 June 1943) is a former Supreme Court of Queensland justicethe first woman to sit on the Supreme Court of Queensland. White was appointed to the Supreme Court in 1992 and was elevated to an Appeals Court Justice in 2010 until retirement in 2013.  She has also previously served as a law lecturer at the University of Queensland.

Royal commission
In August 2016, White was appointed joint Commissioner with Mick Gooda for the Royal Commission into the Protection and Detention of Children in the Northern Territory, replacing Brian Ross Martin.

Naval service
White became an inaugural member of the revived Women's Royal Australian Naval Service Reserve (WRANSR) in 1968. She served as a commander in the Royal Australian Naval Reserve from 2002 to 2010.

Order of Australia
White was appointed as an Officer of the Order of Australia (AO) in the 2013 Australia Day Honours for "distinguished service to the judiciary and the law, through leadership in administration, contributions to education and law reform, and to the community of Queensland."

References

1943 births
Living people
Judges of the Supreme Court of Queensland
Fellows of the Australian Academy of Law
Australian women judges
Academic staff of the University of Queensland
Officers of the Order of Australia
Recipients of the Centenary Medal
People from Adelaide
Adelaide Law School alumni
Royal Australian Navy officers
People from Hamilton, Victoria